With a Little Help from Myself is a 2008 French comedy-drama film written and directed by François Dupeyron. The film received four nominations at the 14th Lumières Awards and won Best Director for Dupeyron.

Cast 
 Félicité Wouassi as Sonia 
 Claude Rich as Robert 
 Ralph Amoussou as Victor 
 Charles-Etienne N'Diaye as Léo 
 Mata Gabin as Marijo
 Jacky Ido as Fer
 Carole Franck as The Inspector

References

External links 
 

2008 films
2008 comedy-drama films
2000s French-language films
French comedy-drama films
Films directed by François Dupeyron
Films whose director won the Best Director Lumières Award
2000s French films